Bhagonwali is an Indian daily soap opera that aired on Zee TV. The series premiered on 6 December 2010. It is produced by Samidha Khalid's Creative Lab. It tells the story of Runjhun who brings good luck and fortune wherever she goes. However, her own life is riddled with misfortune and hard work because of her circumstances. This show went off air on 17 February 2012, ending with a total of 318 episodes. The show was replaced by Punar Vivaah.

Plot
The story is set in Kannauj, Uttar Pradesh. Runjhun, an orphan, lives with her uncles and aunts and is treated like a servant in the house. However, Runjhun remains cheerful and ready to do any work. Her maternal grandmother tries to shield her after she learns that Runjhun is a bhagonwali (the lucky one) who will bring good luck and prosperity wherever she goes. Runjhun's aunts plot against her and get her married to a local goon Guddu Shukla who agrees to live with them. Runjhun throws Guddu a challenge that she will turn him into a good husband and human being.

Guddu decides to teach Runjhun's evil relatives a lesson but she feels bad for them and tries to help them. This upsets Guddu who tries to convince her that they deserve it. Guddu and Runjhun's relationship worsens when his ex-girlfriend, Nilu, enters their lives. She has Runjhun abducted. She forces Guddu to marry her if he wants to know where Runjhun is being held. Guddu marries Nilu though Runjhun escapes but before she can stop the wedding, she is shot by Jhabbu. When Nilu takes Guddu to where Runjhun was held, she is killed by the kidnapper who is then arrested.

Guddu finally finds Runjhun who has lost her memory. Her relatives try to deceive her. She becomes obsessed with the idea of getting a child and asks Guddu to marry her. Not wanting to take advantage of her memory loss, he initially refuses but finally agrees. As they marry, Runjhun begins to remember. Her relatives finally accept her and the family is reunited in a happy ending.

Cast
The following is a list of the cast members and the characters they play on the television show:
 Nivedita Tiwari as Runjhun Guddu Shukla
 Himmanshoo A. Malhotra as Guddu Shukla
 Rita Bhaduri as Ahilya Devi / Runjhun's Nani (grandmother)
 Ankit Bathla as Abhigyan
 Vaishali Nazareth as Billo Pandey
 Sagar Saini as Rajju Pandey
 Mona Ray as Mittho Pandey
 Jyotsna Chandola as Mahadevi Pandey
 Madan Tyagi as Vishnu Pandey
 Suruchi Verma as Kalsanwali
 Jayesh Yadav as Kukkan
 Aashutosh Tiwari as Jabbu
 Supriya Kumari as Nilu
 Aakash Pandey as Khabri Tiwari

Awards
Zee Rishtey Awards 2011
Favourite Mastikhor Sadasya - Guddu Shukla

References

Zee TV original programming
Indian television soap operas
2010 Indian television series debuts
2012 Indian television series endings
Television shows set in Uttar Pradesh